Ian Cantwell (born 24 July 1966 in Harefield) is a former British auto racing driver who drove in the British Touring Car Championship.

Racing career
He first started in motocross for 12 years and was a champion at 16, along with a couple of years karting. In 1991 he drove in the BRDC Production Saloon Car Championship, finishing 2nd in the GT class. For 1992 he raced in the British Group N Saloon Car Championship.  He spent one year in the BTCC in 1993 driving a former works Mazda 323F for Asquith Autosport. His best race finish was a 9th place in the 2nd round at Donington Park. In 1996 he competed in the inaugural year of the Elf Renault Sport Spider UK Cup.

Complete British Touring Car Championship results
(key) (Races in bold indicate pole position) (Races in italics indicate fastest lap)

References

1966 births
Living people
British Touring Car Championship drivers
English racing drivers
People from Harefield